Jonathan Rechner (April 11, 1972 – April 12, 2016), better known by his ring name Balls Mahoney, was an American professional wrestler. He is perhaps best known for his appearances with Extreme Championship Wrestling (ECW) during the late 1990s and early 2000s, where he was a three-time ECW Tag Team Champion, as well as working for World Wrestling Entertainment (WWE) on its ECW brand.

Early life
Rechner was born in Spring Lake Heights, New Jersey. A graduate of Manasquan High School where he competed on the school's wrestling team, He started wrestling at the age of 15.

Professional wrestling career

Early career (1987–1993) 
Rechner trained at the Monster Factory and debuted in 1987, at age 15, as "Abbudah Singh". He began wrestling on the independent circuit in New Jersey.

Smoky Mountain Wrestling (1994–1995)
He made a name for himself as Boo Bradley Jr. (a take-off of the character Boo Radley from To Kill a Mockingbird) in Smoky Mountain Wrestling (SMW). He was originally allied with Chris Candido and managed by Tammy Sytch, who abused him for months, but they eventually turned on him, killing his pet cat, and turning him into a fan favorite in the process. He formed a friendship with Cactus Jack during this time.  He went on to have a lengthy rivalry with Candido and Sytch.  After his battles with Candido he moved on to a feud with Killer Kyle of the Gangstas.  During his time in SMW Bradley won the SMW Beat the Champ Television Championship twice.

World Wrestling Federation (1992–1993, 1995–1996) 
From 1992 to 1993 he jobbed under his real name losing to Papa Shango, Marty Jannetty, and Virgil.
In 1995, he briefly appeared in the World Wrestling Federation as Xanta Klaus. At In Your House 5: Seasons Beatings in December, while Savio Vega and "Santa Claus" were at ringside handing out presents and playing to the fans, villainous manager "Million Dollar Man" Ted DiBiase appeared. DiBiase proclaimed that everyone had a price, even Santa. As Vega argued with DiBiase, "Santa" jumped him from behind and attacked him. DiBiase laughed his trademark laugh and introduced this warped Santa as Xanta Klaus, from the South Pole who steals presents. As Xanta, Rechner made only a couple more appearances (one on the following night's Monday Night Raw), before never being mentioned again.

Mid Eastern Wrestling Federation (1996–1997)
After WWF, Rechner wrestled as Boo Bradley for Mid Eastern Wrestling Federation where he became the MEWF Mid-Atlantic Champion.

Extreme Championship Wrestling (1996–2001)

The Hardcore Chair Swingin' Freaks (1996–1999) 
In 1996, Rechner signed with Extreme Championship Wrestling (ECW). He debuted at Holiday Hell as "Balls Mahoney". Capitalizing on the ECW crowd's lust for violence and the hardcore attitude Rechner was never seen without his signature steel chair, usually with some kind of writing or sign placed on it, which he would use to bash any opponent at any time. He would come to the ring to the AC/DC song "Big Balls" and lead the crowd in singing the chorus before or after his matches. While in ECW he teamed with Axl Rotten, a similar hardcore and violent wrestler, and the duo became informally known as "The Hardcore Chair Swingin' Freaks". They feuded with The Dudley Boyz (Buh Buh Ray and D-Von) during their tenure.

Mahoney made his pay-per-view debut at November to Remember, participating in a Four-Way Dance match for the Tag Team Championship, along with his partner Rotten; The F.B.I. (Tracy Smothers and Little Guido) retained the titles. At Living Dangerously, they participated in a three-way dance, along with the Dudleyz in a losing effort to Spike Dudley and New Jack. Mahoney and Rotten got another chance at the titles at Wrestlepalooza against Chris Candido and Lance Storm, but lost.

After failing to win the titles with Rotten, Mahoney found a new partner in Masato Tanaka. At November to Remember, the two defeated Dudley Boyz to win the World Tag Team Championship, thus beginning Mahoney's first reign as tag champion. Six days later, Mahoney and Tanaka dropped the titles to the Dudleyz in a rematch. At Guilty as Charged, Mahoney and Rotten defeated the F.B.I. and Danny Doring and Roadkill in a three-way dance.

Mahoney's first singles match at a pay-per-view was a victory over Steve Corino at Living Dangerously. Shortly after, Mahoney formed a tag team with Spike Dudley. At Hardcore Heaven, the two faced the Dudleyz in a championship match but failed to win the title. The two teams faced in a rematch at Heat Wave, and this time, Mahoney and Dudley won the match and the World Tag Team Championship, marking Mahoney's second individual reign. At a show in August, the duo re-lost the title to the Dudleyz.

On the edition of August 14 of ECW on TNN, Mahoney and Dudley defeated the Dudleyz in another rematch to win back the World Tag Team Championship. At The Last Show at the Madhouse on August 26, they lost the titles to the Dudleyz again. At Anarchy Rulz, ECW World Television Champion Rob Van Dam was scheduled to defend his title against Johnny Smith but before the match, Mahoney, Rotten, and Dudley attacked Smith and took him out of the match. Mahoney then challenged RVD for the title but lost the match.

At November to Remember, Mahoney and Rotten lost to Da Baldies (Spanish Angel, Tony DeVito, Vito LoGrasso, and P. N. News) in a 4-on-2 handicap match.

Final days of ECW (2000–2001)
During an exchange of blows, ECW fans would often chant "Balls!" when Rechner landed a punch or kick on an opponent, and "Nuts!" when his opponent retaliated. At Living Dangerously, he defeated Kintaro Kanemura. He met his former tag team partner, Masato Tanaka in the first match at Hardcore Heaven, which Tanaka won.

At Heat Wave, he lost a match to F.B.I. member Sal E. Graziano. He formed a tag team with Chilly Willy and the duo feuded with Da Baldies. After losing a match to Da Baldies at Anarchy Rulz, Mahoney and Willy defeated them in a Flaming Tables match at November to Remember. At Massacre on 34th Street, Mahoney lost to EZ Money.

Mahoney's final ECW appearance was at ECW's final pay-per-view Guilty as Charged where Mahoney and Chilly Willy's match with Simon Diamond and Johnny Swinger ended in a no contest.

Independent circuit (2001–2006)
After ECW folded, Rechner spent time in a number of independent federations across America, most notably USA Pro Wrestling (UXW) as well as Juggalo Championship Wrestling where he united with The Dead Pool (Violent J, Shaggy 2 Dope, and Raven) to become The Dead Pool 2000. He made an appearance in Total Nonstop Action Wrestling (TNA) in 2004, teaming with The Sandman to face off against The Gathering. On January 9, 2004, he wrestled for Ring Of Honor losing to Samoa Joe.

Return to WWE (2005, 2006–2008)

In 2005, Mahoney made a non-wrestling appearance at the World Wrestling Entertainment-promoted ECW One Night Stand reunion show, taking part—alongside Axl Rotten—in a brawl with Kid Kash, Tommy Dreamer, The Sandman, the Dudley Boyz, and The Blue World Order (bWo) before the main event. After the main event, Mahoney and Rotten returned to the ring to brawl with the "invading" Raw and SmackDown! wrestlers.

In 2006, when WWE relaunched ECW as their own brand, one of the first announcements was the signing of Balls Mahoney. His signing was announced with that of Axl Rotten, but when Rotten missed some WWE dates and was released, Balls was left to start a singles career. During the "cross promotion" hype, Balls appeared on the June 5 edition of Raw with other ECW wrestlers who proceeded to attack WWE Champion John Cena. He appeared again as a part of the ECW team in the "WWE vs. ECW team battle royal" at the WWE vs. ECW Head to Head event on June 7. At ECW One Night Stand, Balls defeated Masato Tanaka in a match following a chair shot (denting the chair) to Tanaka's head.

When ECW on Sci Fi debuted, Balls started off with a small role in the company, having sporadic matches and little else. Shortly after, his internal name within the company became "Blue Balls' due to his distinctive blue coloring. Once the show got going he started to appear in vignettes talking about how tough he was, elevating his role on the show. On the edition of September 5 of ECW on Sci Fi Mahoney entered a feud with Kevin Thorn after Thorn and his valet Ariel cost him a match against Stevie Richards and the next week, René Duprée.

The following week, he brought Francine to ringside with him, marking her first televised appearance at the revived ECW ring, where she proceeded to get into a catfight with Ariel. That pairing, however, was short lived as Francine was released shortly after.

At December to Dismember, Mahoney defeated Matt Striker in a Striker's Rules match.

On the edition of January 2, 2007 of ECW on Sci Fi, Mahoney had one of his front teeth legitimately knocked out during a match with Kevin Thorn. Shortly after, Balls began a short feud with Snitsky. On the edition of June 5 of ECW, Balls, Tommy Dreamer, and the Sandman faced Bobby Lashley in a 3 on 1 Hardcore Handicap match for the ECW World Championship, in which they were defeated.

On the August 7, 2007 episode of ECW, Balls went against The Miz in a losing effort. During and after the match, it appeared that Kelly Kelly was concerned about him. Over the weeks that followed, he attempted to ask her out and flirted with her backstage, but was interrupted by The Miz, Brooke, and Layla before Kelly could get a word in. Regardless, Kelly still showed interest in him each week, wishing him good luck before his match and cheering him on during his match. He asked if she would go out with him to which she could not respond due to The Miz taking her backstage. Weeks later, however, Kelly asked him out, starting an on-screen relationship.

On February 29, 2008, Balls made his return to television on SmackDown, taking on Big Daddy V. The match went to a no contest after The Undertaker chokeslammed Mahoney. Mahoney was released from his WWE contract on April 28, 2008.

Return to independent circuit (2008–2016)

On December 13, 2008, he returned to wrestling in World Wrestling Council his re-debut match against Abdullah the Butcher in Bayamon Puerto Rico in the annual event WWC Lockout, Abdullah the Butcher's final match in WWC. On April 16, he and Brother Runt appeared on TNA Impact! to wish Team 3D luck in their match at Lockdown. They later were attacked by Beer Money, Inc. Mahoney made an appearance for Insane Clown Posse's Juggalo Championship Wrestling at the 10th Annual Gathering Of The Juggalos on August 8, 2009, interfering in a "Loser Leaves JCW" match between 2 Tuff Tony and Viscera, which also featured WWE Hall of Famer Terry Funk as a special guest referee. After Viscera won the match, he, Mahoney, and Funk all attacked Tony. Also, as of late 2009, Mahoney has become a regular competitor for National Wrestling Superstars. On May 8, 2010, Mahoney made his debut for Ring of Honor, saving Grizzly Redwood from Erick Stevens and The Embassy. On July 29, 2010, it was confirmed that Mahoney would take part in TNA's ECW reunion show Hardcore Justice on August 8. However, his name was later pulled from the event's official website. At the event Rechner, using the ring name Kahoneys, teamed with Axl Rotten in a South Philadelphia Street Fight, where they were defeated by Team 3D. After the match Rechner vented his frustrations on Axl Rotten, proclaiming that he would never again team with him.

On September 11, 2010, Rechner returned to Ring of Honor at Glory By Honor IX, where he, competing under the ring name Ballz Mahoney, teamed with Grizzly Redwood in a losing effort against Erick Stevens and Necro Butcher. On October 23, 2010, Mahoney and Axl Rotten reunited at a Jersey All Pro Wrestling, where they unsuccessfully challenged Monsta Mack and Havok for the JAPW Tag Team Championship, in a three-way match, which was won by Sami Callihan and Chris Dickinson. On October 18, 2014, Mahoney was defeated by Sabu to crown the first WWL Extreme Champion at Insurrection. Mahoney's last match before his death took place at the DFC A Very Deathproof Christmas event on December 6, 2015, defeating Shaunymo in a Flaming Tables Match in Toronto, Ontario.

Personal life
Rechner's son, Christopher, was born on November 15, 2007.

Rechner had numerous tattoos, including two tribal pieces, a dragon and inverted pentagram on his arm (he was a member of the Church of Satan), and a tattoo dedicated to deceased wrestler and the namesake of his son Chris Candido. Rechner and Candido were childhood friends who got their start in the wrestling business setting up rings for local shows during their teenage years and eventually trained together at the Monster Factory.

On August 21, 2010, Rechner was charged with disorderly conduct after brandishing a knife during a staged fight with fellow wrestler "Calypso" Jim Zaccone in South Brunswick, New Jersey. The fight was meant to drum up publicity for an upcoming match in Perth Amboy, New Jersey.

Death
On April 12, 2016, a day after his 44th birthday, Rechner died suddenly at his home in Spring Lake Heights, New Jersey. He was watching Jeopardy! as he laid on his side to get more comfortable. Moments later, his wife noticed he was unconscious and called 911 before attempting CPR. However, he had already died before medics arrived. His death was first reported via Twitter by Johnny Candido.  His autopsy was released in August 2016, where it ruled he had died of a heart attack. On October 21, 2016, it was revealed Rechner had experienced CTE. As a result of the CTE diagnosis, the Rechner family became part of a class-action lawsuit against the WWE over these reports and was represented by attorney Konstantine Kyros. U.S. district judge Vanessa Lynne Bryant dismissed the lawsuit in September 2018.

Championships and accomplishments 
Assault Championship Wrestling
ACW Heavyweight Championship (1 time)
ACW Hardcore Championship (1 time)
All World Wrestling League
AWWL Heavyweight Championship (1 time)
Extreme Championship Wrestling
ECW World Tag Team Championship (3 times) – with Spike Dudley (2), and Masato Tanaka (1)
Fight The World Wrestling
FTW World Heavyweight Championship (2 times)
International Wrestling Association
IWA Hardcore Championship (1 time)
International Wrestling Cartel
IWC World Heavyweight Championship (1 time)
National Wrestling Superstars
NWS Hardcore Championship (1 time)
NWS Six Man Tag Team Championship (1 time) – with Ba-Bu and La-Fu
Pro Wrestling Illustrated
PWI ranked him #99 of the top 500 singles wrestlers in the PWI 500 in 2000
PWI ranked him #443 of the 500 best singles wrestlers of the PWI Years in 2003.
Pro Wrestling Xtreme / Classic Championship Wrestling
PWX World Heavyweight Championship (1 time)
Smoky Mountain Wrestling
SMW Beat the Champ Television Championship (2 times)
USA Xtreme Wrestling
UXW Heavyweight Championship (7 times)

See also

 List of premature professional wrestling deaths

References

External links

 
 Balls Mahoney Interview with WrestlingNewsSource.com Podcast
 

1972 births
2016 deaths
American male professional wrestlers
Manasquan High School alumni
People from Spring Lake Heights, New Jersey
Professional wrestlers from New Jersey
Professional wrestlers with chronic traumatic encephalopathy
People from the New York metropolitan area
ECW Originals members
The Million Dollar Corporation members
ECW World Tag Team Champions
American LaVeyan Satanists
20th-century professional wrestlers
21st-century professional wrestlers
SMW Beat the Champ Television Champions